Lorraine Henao Harry (born 20 February 1996) is a Papua New Guinean weightlifter. She represented Papua New Guinea at the 2019 Pacific Games and she won the silver medal in the women's 87kg event.

In 2017, at the Asian Indoor and Martial Arts Games held in Ashgabat, Turkmenistan, she finished in 6th place in the women's 90kg event.

In 2018, she represented Papua New Guinea at the Commonwealth Games held in Gold Coast, Australia. She finished in 7th place in the women's 90 kg event.

References

External links 
 

Living people
1996 births
Place of birth missing (living people)
Papua New Guinean female weightlifters
Commonwealth Games competitors for Papua New Guinea
Weightlifters at the 2018 Commonwealth Games